The Boss is the tenth studio album by American singer Diana Ross, released on May 23, 1979 by Motown Records.

Background
This album was written and produced by longtime Ross collaborators Nickolas Ashford & Valerie Simpson and marked her return to Top 40 radio based on the strength of the title track, which peaked at number 19 on the pop singles chart, and number 12 on the US R&B Chart. In addition, all the LP tracks went to number one on the dance charts, and the album itself peaked at number 14 on the Billboard 200. It was certified Gold by the Recording Industry Association of America (RIAA).

For its 20th Anniversary in 1999, the album was remastered and released on CD with 12" versions of "The Boss" and "It's My House" as extra tracks. The 12" versions of "I Ain't Been Licked" and "No One Gets the Prize"/"The Boss" appear on Diana: Deluxe Edition, and a rare remixed single version of "No One Gets the Prize" on The Motown Anthology – Diana Ross.

Ross also promoted the album on her first HBO special, Standing Room Only. The special was culled from her successful "Tour '79" stop at Caesars Palace, and the setlist included the title song, "The Boss", plus "It's My House", "No One Gets the Prize", "I Ain't Been Licked" and "All for One".

Track listing
All tracks were written and produced by Ashford & Simpson.

Side A
"No One Gets the Prize"  – 4:40
"I Ain't Been Licked"  – 4:09
"All for One"  – 4:20
"The Boss"  – 3:52

Side B
"Once in the Morning"  – 4:54
"It's My House"  – 4:34
"Sparkle"  – 5:23
"I'm in the World"  – 4:04

1999 Remastered Edition bonus tracks
 "The Boss" (Original 12" Remix) – 7:15
"It's My House" (Original Promotion-only 12" Remix) – 6:07

Personnel
Diana Ross – lead vocals
Michael Brecker – saxophone
Rob Mounsey – horn & string arrangements (tracks: A1-A3)
Errol Bennett – percussion
Francisco Centeno – bass
Ray Chew – keyboards
Sammy Figueroa – percussion
Eric Gale – guitar
Anthony Jackson – bass
Paul Riser – horn and string arrangements (tracks: B1, B3-B4)
John Davis – horn and string arrangements (tracks:A4, B3)
Valerie Simpson – piano, backing vocals
Nickolas Ashford – backing vocals
Maxine Waters – backing vocals
Julia Waters – backing vocals
Stephanie Spruill – backing vocals
John Sussewell – drums
Greg Arnold – re-mix engineer, Marathon Recording NYC
Douglas Kirkland – photography

Charts

Weekly charts

Year-end charts

Certifications

References

1979 albums
Diana Ross albums
Albums arranged by Paul Riser
Albums produced by Ashford & Simpson
Motown albums